Christina Massini is a German female canoeist who was finalist at senior level at the 2019 Wildwater Canoeing World Championships.

References

External links
 

2002 births
Living people
German female canoeists
Place of birth missing (living people)